Johannes-Heinrich Uibopuu (29 January 1886 Vana-Antsla Parish (now Antsla Parish), Kreis Werro – 4 February 1986 Tallinn) was an Estonian politician. He was a member of II Riigikogu.

References

1886 births
1986 deaths
People from Antsla Parish
People from Kreis Werro
National Liberal Party (Estonia) politicians
Members of the Riigikogu, 1923–1926